Mountain View High School is a public school in El Paso, Texas, (United States). It is part of the Clint Independent School District.

History
Mountain View Jr./Sr. High School opened its doors to students on September 4, 1989. It serviced students in grades 7-10, and enrollment was 457. The library served as both a cafeteria and a gymnasium until these facilities opened in January 1990. During the school years of 1990-1991 the school serviced students in grades 7-10, and enrollment was 638. Wings on the east side of the campus were completed, and the training room was built. The name of the school newspaper was changed to Lobo Press. On the school years 1991-1992, Seventy-four seniors became Mountain View 's first graduating class. Students experienced their first Homecoming, High-Q joined, and grass was planted. Enrollment was 1041 and consisted of students in grades 6-12. In the school years 1992-1993 Mountain View High School with the opening of East Montana Middle School allowed the school to become a full high school by serving grades 9-12 and an enrollment of 580. Mountain View High School has ever since grown larger and continues to improve its educational achievements  
.

Extracurricular activities

Art Club
Book Club
Business Professionals of America 
Flags
JROTC
Law Enforcement
Lobo Fanatics
Marching Band
National Honor Society
Newspaper
Robotics Club
Sociedad Honoraria Hispánica
Student Council
UIL Academics
Yearbook
Howlin' Wolf Theatre Company Drama Club
HPA (Health Professions Academy)

Sports

Boys

Football
Basketball
Baseball
Tennis
Track & Field
Cross Country
Golf

Girls

Volleyball
Basketball
Softball
Tennis
Track & Field
Cross Country
Golf
Cheer

References

External links

School history
Clint ISD

High schools in El Paso, Texas
Clint Independent School District high schools
Educational institutions established in 1989
1989 establishments in Texas